Fucking with Nobody is a 2020 Finnish comedy film directed by Hannaleena Hauru from a screenplay by Hauru and Lasse Poser. The film stars Hannaleena Hauru, Lasse Poser, Samuel Kujala, Pietu Wikström, Sara Melleri, Hanna-Kaisa Tiainen, Jussi Lankoski, Anna Kuusamo and Tanja Heinänen.

The film has its worldwide premiere at the 77th Venice International Film Festival on September 8, 2020, as part of the Biennale College Cinema program.

Cast
The cast include:
 Hannaleena Hauru
 Lasse Poser
 Samuel Kujala
 Pietu Wikström
 Sara Melleri
 Hanna-Kaisa Tiainen
 Jussi Lankoski
 Anna Kuusamo
 Tanja Heinänen

Release
On February 12, 2021 it was announced that the film would have its U.S. premiere at SXSW.

References

External links
 

Finnish comedy films
2020 comedy films
2020s Finnish-language films